Hamnett Pinhey Hill (December 18, 1876 – December 15, 1942) was an Ontario lawyer and political figure. He represented Ottawa West in the Legislative Assembly of Ontario from 1919 to 1923 as a Conservative member.

Biography
He was born in Ottawa, the son of Hamnett Pinhey Hill (1845-1879) and Margaret Christie, and the grandson of Dr. Hamnett Hill, M.R.C.S. (b.1811, England; d.1898, Ottawa) and Mary Anne Pinhey, second daughter of Hon. Hamnett Kirkes Pinhey (b. England, 1784; d. Ontario, 1857). Hill was educated in Ottawa and at Toronto University In 1907, he married Beatrice Sara Lindsay. He was a lieutenant in the Army Service Corps. Hill was the author of Robert Randall and the Le Breton Flats, which described the controversy around the sale of the Lebreton Flats property formerly owned by Robert Randal. He died in 1942 in Ottawa.

References 

 Canadian Parliamentary Guide, 1920, EJ Chambers

External links 
Member's parliamentary history for the Legislative Assembly of Ontario

1876 births
1942 deaths
Politicians from Ottawa
Progressive Conservative Party of Ontario MPPs